Barsuan (Bärśewän) is a rural locality (a village) in Yamakayevsky Selsoviet, Blagovarsky District, Bashkortostan, Russia. The population was 146 as of 2010. There are 3 streets.

Geography 
Barsuan is located 19 km southeast of Yazykovo (the district's administrative centre) by road. Yamakay is the nearest rural locality.

References 

Rural localities in Blagovarsky District